"New Day" is a song recorded by America singer Patti LaBelle. It was written by LaBelle along with Pierre Medor, Dwayne Nesmith, Tiffany Palmer, Carlos Ricketts, and Jason Rome for her 2004 studio album Timeless Journey, while production was helmed by Rome along with The Corner Boys. Released as the first single from the album, it became a minor hit for the singer, reaching number 36 on the US Billboard Hot R&B/Hip-Hop Songs and number 93 on the Billboard Hot 100, marking LaBelle's first appearance on the Hot 100 since 1997. An EP of dance remixes titled New Day Club Mixes, was released to support the song in dance clubs, and was remixed by a variety of dance producers such as Louis Vega, Quentin Harris, Kryia & Velez, and Darryl James. It reached number eleven on the Hot Dance Club Songs.

Live performances
Patti gave a notable performance of the track at the MGM Grand Las Vegas when she headlined VH1 Divas 2004.

Charts

References

2004 singles
Patti LaBelle songs
2004 songs
Dance-pop songs
Songs written by Patti LaBelle